Ashok Lokhande (born 9 September 1962) is an Indian film, television and theatre actor. He is best known for playing the role of Arun Rathi (Bhabasa) in the Star Plus Show Diya Aur Baati Hum and its sequel Tu Sooraj, Main Saanjh Piyaji.

Education
He is an alumnus of the National School of Drama in New Delhi, India. He is also alumnus of LOK-HIT Higher Secondary School, Pusad.

Career
Lokhande has appeared in small parts in television series including Chanakya (1990), Just Mohabbat (1997) and Saans (1999).  He has also acted in films including Khamoshi: The Musical (1996) and Sarfarosh (1999).

He currently plays Dharampal Kaatelal Ruhail in the Sony Sab series Kaatelal & Sons.

Film and television

 Teesri Azaadi (2006)
 Chanakya (1990) 
 Dr. Babasaheb Ambedkar (2000) - Bhaurao Gaikwad
 Mrignayanee (1991)
 Khamoshi: The Musical (1996)
 Just Mohabbat (1997)
 Saans (1999)
 Sarfarosh (1999)
 Your Honour (2000)
 Son Pari (2000–2004)
 Jo Kahunga Sach Kahunga as Fateh Singh 
 Black Friday (2004 film)
 Teesri Azadi
 Diya Aur Baati Hum (2011–2016)
 Mohabatain (1970)
 Brothers (2015)
 Raman Raghav 2.0 (2016 film)
 TV, Biwi aur Main (2017)
 Tu Sooraj Main Saanjh, Piyaji (2017-2018)
Main Maike Chali Jaungi, Tum Dekhte Rahiyo(2019)
Kaatelal & Sons (2020-2021)

References

External links 
 

Indian male film actors
Indian male television actors
Indian male stage actors
Living people
Indian male soap opera actors
1950 births
20th-century Indian male actors
21st-century Indian male actors
Male actors from Mumbai